The 2013 Girls' Youth European Volleyball Championship was played in Serbia and Montenegro from March 30 to April 7, 2013. The top six teams qualified for the 2013 Youth World Championship.

Participating teams
 Host
 
 
 Defending Champion
 
 Qualified through 2013 Girls' Youth European Volleyball Championship Qualification

Preliminary round
The draw was held on 18 January 2013 at Belgrade, Serbia.

Pool A
 Bar, Montenegro.

Pool B
 Kladovo, Serbia.

Final round

5th to 8th places bracket

Championship bracket

5th to 8th classification

Semifinals

7th place match

5th place match

3rd place match

Final

Final standing

Individual awards

Most Valuable Player

Best Spiker

Best Blocker

Best Server

Best Scorer

Best Setter

Best Receiver

Best Libero

References

External links
http://www.cev.lu/Competition-Area/competition.aspx?ID=597&PID=1252 

2013 in volleyball
Volleyball
Volleyball
Girls' Youth European Volleyball Championship
Volleyball in Montenegro
International volleyball competitions hosted by Serbia
International volleyball competitions hosted by Montenegro